Rémi Massé is a Canadian politician who represented the riding of Avignon—La Mitis—Matane—Matapédia in the House of Commons of Canada in the 2015 federal election until 2019.

Electoral record

References

External links
 Official website (copy archived July 19, 2019)
 House of Commons Page
 Twitter Profile

Living people
Liberal Party of Canada MPs
Members of the House of Commons of Canada from Quebec
People from Rivière-du-Loup
Université de Sherbrooke alumni
21st-century Canadian politicians
Year of birth missing (living people)